Bayou Barbary is an unincorporated community in Livingston Parish, Louisiana, United States.

Early settlers
The earliest documented settlers in Bayou Barbary were Joseph Thomas and three brothers from the Denham family. The area of Bayou Barbary was excluded from the Louisiana Purchase and left these early settlers behind as subjects of West Florida and the Spanish Empire. A local man named Philemon Thomas organized the revolt and Joseph Thomas led the militia to assist with the capture of Fort San Carlos which was under Spanish control. Early in the morning on September 23, 1810, the rebels stormed the fort killing several Spanish soldiers. It was a quick battle but the rebels succeeded and for a period of 74 days established the Republic of West Florida.

United States annexation

Notable people
Laine Hardy, American Idol contestant 2018; American Idol winner 2019

References

Unincorporated communities in Livingston Parish, Louisiana
Unincorporated communities in Louisiana
Unincorporated communities in New Orleans metropolitan area